Do Dilon Ki Dastaan may refer to the following films:

Do Dilon Ki Dastaan (1966 film), directed by Pradeep Kumar
Do Dilon Ki Dastaan (1985 film), directed by A. C. Tirulokchandar